Boddam is a village on the island of Mainland, in Shetland, Scotland.

Boddam is an area of Dunrossness in the South Mainland of Shetland. Although Boddam is just the name for the few houses at the head of the voe, including the slaughterhouse, the nearby estates of Hillock, Dalsetter Wynd, and Turniebrae are also usually referred to as being in Boddam. Boddam has a working Norse horizontal mill and the Croft House Museum.

The sea off Boddam hosts a population of sandeel that provides a food source for many species fish, seabirds, seals, whales and dolphins: the area is considered to have the most reliable population of sandeels of all the seas surrounding Shetland, and is now designated as a Nature Conservation Marine Protected Area (NCMPA).

References

External links

Canmore - Southvoe Broch site record

Villages in Mainland, Shetland
Nature Conservation Marine Protected Areas of Scotland